Sobrado is a closed halt on the Algarve line in the municipality of Silves, Portugal. It is part of the section from Algoz to Poço Barreto, which opened on 19 March 1900.

References

Railway stations in Portugal
Railway stations opened in 1900